Regina South was a provincial electoral district for the Legislative Assembly of Saskatchewan, Canada. Originally created for the 15th Saskatchewan general election in 1964, this constituency changed boundaries and names many times. It was dissolved into Regina Pasqua and Regina University prior to the 2016 election.

The district was called "Regina Whitmore Park" from 1971 to 1975, and "Regina Albert South" from 1991 to 1995.

Members of the Legislative Assembly

Election results

|-

 
|NDP
|Yens Pedersen
|align="right"|3,534
|align="right"|42.61%
|align="right"|+1.40

|- bgcolor="white"
!align="left" colspan=3|Total
!align="right"|8,294
!align="right"|100.00%
!align="right"|

|-

 
|NDP
|Yens Pedersen
|align="right"|4,047
|align="right"|41.21%
|align="right"|-8.25

|- bgcolor="white"
!align="left" colspan=3|Total
!align="right"|9,820
!align="right"|100.00%
!align="right"|

|-
 
| style="width: 130px" |NDP
|Andrew Thomson
|align="right"|3,324
|align="right"|38.99%
|align="right"|-9.12

|- bgcolor="white"
!align="left" colspan=3|Total
!align="right"|8,525
!align="right"|100.00%
!align="right"|

|-
 
| style="width: 130px" |NDP
|Andrew Thomson
|align="right"|4,139
|align="right"|48.11%
|align="right"|+1.68

|Prog. Conservative
|John Weir
|align="right"|643
|align="right"|7.47%
|align="right"|-11.39
|- bgcolor="white"
!align="left" colspan=3|Total
!align="right"|8,603
!align="right"|100.00%
!align="right"|

|-
 
| style="width: 130px" |NDP
|Serge Kujawa
|align="right"|4,333
|align="right"|46.43%
|align="right"|+8.59

|Prog. Conservative
|Jack Klein
|align="right"|1,761
|align="right"|18.86%
|align="right"|-26.12

|Independent
|John O'Donoghue
|align="right"|106
|align="right"|1.14%
|align="right"|–
|- bgcolor="white"
!align="left" colspan=3|Total
!align="right"|9,333
!align="right"|100.00%
!align="right"|

|-

| style="width: 130px" |Progressive Conservative
|Jack Klein
|align="right"|4,115
|align="right"|44.98%
|align="right"|-20.89
 
|NDP
|Margaret Fern
|align="right"|3,462
|align="right"|37.84%
|align="right"|+6.80

|- bgcolor="white"
!align="left" colspan=3|Total
!align="right"|9,149
!align="right"|100.00%
!align="right"|

|-

| style="width: 130px" |Progressive Conservative
|Paul Rousseau
|align="right"|6,088
|align="right"|65.87%
|align="right"|+24.96
 
|NDP
|Margaret Fern
|align="right"|2,869
|align="right"|31.04%
|align="right"|-7.28

|- bgcolor="white"
!align="left" colspan=3|Total
!align="right"|9,243
!align="right"|100.00%
!align="right"|

|-

| style="width: 130px" |Progressive Conservative
|Paul Rousseau
|align="right"|3,325
|align="right"|40.91%
|align="right"|+14.41
 
|NDP
|John Hettema
|align="right"|3,114
|align="right"|38.32%
|align="right"|+13.69

|- bgcolor="white"
!align="left" colspan=3|Total
!align="right"|8,127
!align="right"|100.00%
!align="right"|

|-

|Prog. Conservative
|Paul Rousseau
|align="right"|2,059
|align="right"|26.50%
|align="right"|-
 
|NDP
|Eric H. Cline
|align="right"|1,913
|align="right"|24.63%
|align="right"|-9.52
|- bgcolor="white"
!align="left" colspan=3|Total
!align="right"|7,768
!align="right"|100.00%
!align="right"|

|-

 
|NDP
|Art Lloyd
|align="right"|1,959
|align="right"|34.15%
|align="right"|+6.64
|- bgcolor="white"
!align="left" colspan=3|Total
!align="right"|5,736
!align="right"|100.00%
!align="right"|

|-

 
|NDP
|Jack W. Kehoe
|align="right"|2,575
|align="right"|27.51%
|align="right"|-3.13

|Prog. Conservative
|Lillian Groeller
|align="right"|487
|align="right"|5.21%
|align="right"|–
|- bgcolor="white"
!align="left" colspan=3|Total
!align="right"|9,359
!align="right"|100.00%
!align="right"|

|-

 
|CCF
|George R. Bothwell
|align="right"|3,440
|align="right"|30.64%
|align="right"|–
|- bgcolor="white"
!align="left" colspan=3|Total
!align="right"|11,228
!align="right"|100.00%
!align="right"|

See also
 South Regina – Northwest Territories territorial electoral district (1870–1905).

References

External links 
Website of the Legislative Assembly of Saskatchewan
Saskatchewan Archives Board – Saskatchewan Election Results By Electoral Division

Politics of Regina, Saskatchewan
Former provincial electoral districts of Saskatchewan